Philip Andrew Williams (b 1964) has been Archdeacon of Nottingham since September 2019.

Williams was educated at the University of Sheffield and Cranmer Hall, Durham; and ordained in 1991. After a curacies in Sheffield and Nottingham he was the incumbent at Lenton Abbey from 1994 to 2002  and Porchester from 2002 until 2017. He was an Associate Archdeacon from 2017 to 2019 and his appointment as Archdeacon.

References

1964 births
Living people
21st-century English Anglican priests
20th-century English Anglican priests
Alumni of the University of Sheffield
Alumni of Cranmer Hall, Durham
Archdeacons of Nottingham